David Beckwith was an American journalist and political spokesman. From 1971 to 1978, he was a correspondent and legal editor for Time Magazine. In 1978, he was a founding editor of The Legal Times. In 1989, he was the press secretary for Vice President Dan Quayle. He then was the campaign manager for Texas Senator Kay Bailey Hutchison.

References 

1940s births
2022 deaths
20th-century American journalists
21st-century American journalists